The .32 Remington (also known as the .32 Remington Auto-Loading or .32 Remington Rimless) is an American rifle cartridge. A rimless, smokeless powder design, this cartridge was once considered to be suitable for game larger than deer and black bear. Similar contemporary cartridges include the rimmed .32 Winchester Special, a cartridge introduced by Winchester and offered as a chambering in Winchester's lever-action rifles.

Description
The .32 Remington cartridge dates to 1906 and its introduction by Remington in the Remington Model 8 rifle. Other rifles chambered for the .32 Remington include the Remington Model 81, Remington Model 14 slide-action, Remington Model 30 bolt action, Stevens Model 425 lever-action, and Standard Arms Company rifles. Due to their similar dimensions, the .25 Remington, .30 Remington, and .32 Remington together were known as the Remington Rimless cartridge series. Firearm manufacturers generally offered all three of these cartridges as chamberings in a rifle model rather than just one of the series.

This cartridge was chambered in the Remington Model 141 also. The .35 Remington was also a part of the old Remington rimless lineup, although it is based on a rimless version of the .30-40 Krag. This cartridge is a ballistic twin of the .32 Winchester Special.

See also
List of cartridges by caliber
List of rifle cartridges
8 mm caliber

References 

Pistol and rifle cartridges
Remington Arms cartridges